Claypole  may refer to:
 Claypole, Lincolnshire, a village in the South Kesteven district of Lincolnshire, England
 Claypole railway station, a former station in Claypole, Lincolnshire
 Claypole Rural District, a former local government area in Lincolnshire
 Claypole, Buenos Aires
 Club Atlético Claypole, an Argentine Football club

People 
 Arthur Griffin Claypole (1882–1929), a cathedral organist
 Edward Waller Claypole, a palaeontologist
 Elizabeth Claypole (1629–1658), the second daughter of Oliver Cromwell
 John Claypole (1625–1688), an officer in the Parliamentary army during the English Civil War
 Noah Claypole, a character in Oliver Twist